An EXpedite the PRocessing of Experiments to Space Station (ExPRESS) Logistics Carrier (ELC) is an unpressurized attached payload platform for the International Space Station (ISS) that provides mechanical mounting surfaces, electrical power, and command and data handling services for Orbital Replacement Units (ORUs) as well as science experiments on the ISS. The ELCs were developed primarily at the Goddard Space Flight Center in Greenbelt, Maryland, with support from JSC, KSC, and MSFC.  ELC was formerly called "Express Pallet" and is the unpressurized counterpart to the pressurized ExPRESS Rack.  An ELC provides scientists with a platform and infrastructure to deploy experiments in the vacuum of space without requiring a separate dedicated Earth-orbiting satellite.

ELCs interface directly with the ISS integrated truss common attach system (CAS). The P3 Truss has two such attach points called Unpressurised Cargo Carrier Attachment System (UCCAS) mechanisms, one facing zenith (space facing) called UCCAS-1, the other facing nadir (earth facing) called UCCAS-2. The S3 Truss has four similar locations called Payload Attachment System (PAS) mechanisms, two facing Zenith (PAS-1 and PAS-2), and two facing Nadir (PAS-3 and PAS-4).

Description

The ELC are four un-pressurized attached payloads, some designed by the Brazilian Space Agency,  for the International Space Station (ISS) that provides mechanical mounting surfaces, electrical power, and command and data handling services for science experiments on the ISS. The ELCs have a deck size of about 14 feet by 16 feet and spans the width of the space shuttle's payload bay. They are made of steel, coated with UV paint. Each one is capable of providing scientists with a platform and infrastructure to deploy experiments in the vacuum of space without requiring a separate dedicated Earth-orbiting satellite. Each carrier is capable of carrying 9,800 lbs. to orbit and will also serve as parking fixtures for spare ISS hardware (ORUs) which can be retrieved when needed. Experiments are mounted on ExPRESS payload adapters (ExPA) which are about the same size as the FRAMs that hold ORUs.

Electrical subsystem ExPRESS carrier avionics (ExPCA)
Within the electrical subsystem of the ELC, the ExPRESS carrier avionics (ExPCA) provides electrical power distribution to experiments, and data interfaces to the ISS.  Within the ExPCA, the ColdFire-based flight computer, software, and related electronics comprise its "flight controller unit" (FCU).  The FCU runs the free open-source real-time operating system (RTOS) RTEMS and provides the computing and communication resources as an ELC Command and Data Handling (C&DH) system with the following major goals:
 Provide a low-rate data link (LRDL) interface to ISS to accept commands for the ELC and the resident experiments.  The ExPCA is implemented as a remote terminal (RT) on the MIL-STD-1553 "ISS local bus."  This interface also returns housekeeping telemetry from the ExPCA and resident experiments to the ISS.
 Provide an LRDL from the ExPCA to the experiments resident on the ELC to forward commands from the ISS to the experiments and to receive telemetry from the experiments for transmission to the ISS.  This is another MIL-STD-1553 interface, with the ExPCA acting as the Bus Controller (BC).
 Provide a high-rate data link (HRDL) between the ELC and the ISS.  This interface is implemented as a fiber optical data bus with a capacity of up to 95.0 Megabits per second (Mbit/s).  The primary function of this interface is the return on high-volume experiment Science data from the resident experiments to the ISS.
 Provide an Ethernet Local Area Network (LAN) between the ELC and the resident experiments up to 6.0 Mbit/s per experiment.  The primary function of this interface is the return of science experiment data from to the ISS, relayed through the HRDL.
 Support six analog input channels at each ExPA (ExPRESS payload adapter) location.
 Support six discrete command channels at each ExPA location.

Manifested on ELC-2 was the first ELC-based payload, Materials for ISS Experiment (MISSE-7). mounted on an ExPA.

ELC launch schedule
ELC-4 launched on mission STS-133 Discovery on 24 February 2011 and was installed on the station on 27 February. ELC-3 launched on mission STS-134 Endeavour on 16 May 2011 and was installed on the station on 18 May.

The Alpha Magnetic Spectrometer occupies the mounting location intended for ELC-5 on the ISS truss.

Locations and components

ELC-1

ELC-1 is located on the P3 truss at the UCCAS-2 (nadir, earth facing) site. ELC-1 weighs approx. 13,840 lbs. A FRAM is a Flight Releasable Attachment Mechanism.
 FRAM-1 (top side)  Empty, FRAM formerly held STP-H5 ((STP-H5 Temporarily relocated to FRAM 1 on July 29, 2022 disposed on SpaceX CRS 25 on August 19, 2022))Formerly held Latching End Effector (LEE 204) launched on ELC-1
 FRAM-2 (top side)  Plasma Contactor Unit (PCU) launched on ELC-1
 FRAM-3 (top side)  RRM3. Formerly held STP-H4 (delivered by the HTV-4 Exposed Pallet, was placed here by the SSRMS/Dextre Aug. 2013) the payload was removed by SPDM/Dextre on August 27, 2015 and transferred to HTV-5 for disposal.
 FRAM-4 (top side)  Formerly held Battery Charger Discharge Unit (BCDU) launched on ELC-1 (was transferred to the P6 Truss during an EVA Oct. 18, 2019). (New BCDU delivered on SpaceX CRS 25 and installed in its place)
 FRAM-5 (top side)  Control Moment Gyroscope (CMG SN104) launched on ELC-1
 FRAM-6 (keel side) Nitrogen Tank Assembly (NTA SN0002) launched on ELC-1
 FRAM-7 (keel side) Pump Module (PM SN0007) launched on ELC-1
 FRAM-8 (keel side) EMIT, formerly held OPALS and STP-H5 (moved to FRAM-1 see above) (OPALS placed via Dextre/SSRMS May 7, 2014. Delivered by SpaceX Dragon CRS-3 payload was removed by SPDM/Dextre on March 2, 2017 and stored in the trunk of SpaceX Dragon CRS-10 for disposal.)   
 FRAM-9 (keel side) Ammonia Tank Assembly (ATA) launched on ELC-1

ELC-2

ELC-2 is located on the S3 truss at the PAS-1 (zenith, space facing) site, alongside AMS-2 at PAS-2. ELC-2 weighs approx. 13,400 lbs.
 FRAM-1 (top side)  DCSU placed here by SPDM from ESP-2 on Jan. 30, 2013. (CTC-3 moved to FRAM-2 for a test of the SPDM December 22/23, 2011)
 FRAM-2 (top side)  Cargo Transport Container-3 (CTC-3) launched on ELC-2 (moved from FRAM-1 – see above)
 FRAM-3 (top side)  MISSE-FF Facility FRAM formerly held an ExPRESS payload adapter (ExPA) as MISSE base - MISSE-8 was removed by the Exp. 36 crew Jul. 2013 (STS-134 added MISSE-8 replacing MISSE-7 which was launched on ELC-2. STS-135 added MISSE-8 'ORMatE-III exposure plate' to the second MISSE mount). (removed by SPDM and stored in the trunk of SpaceX Dragon CRS-10 for disposal after the black box was removed by the crew. MISSE-FF was delivered on SpaceX CRS-14 and installed on April 12, 2018 by SPDM/Dextre to replace the old unit.)
 FRAM-4 (top side)  High Pressure Gas Tank (HPGT) (Oxygen depleted) replaced the one carried up on ELC-2, which was used to replace a depleted tank from Quest in EVA during STS-129
 FRAM-5 (top side)  Control Moment Gyroscope (CMG SN102) launched on ELC-2
 FRAM-6 (keel side) Pump Module (PM SN0004). Originally held PM SN0005, launched on ELC-2. Healthy SN0005 and degraded SN0004 (on ESP-2) swapped robotically on 6 March 2015.
 FRAM-7 (keel side) NICER FRAM originally held an MBSU (delivered by the HTV-4 Exposed Pallet, and placed here by the SSRMS/SPDM Aug. 2013) removed by Expedition 32 crew and installed on truss degraded unit brought inside and returned to earth on the maiden flight of Dragon on SpX-C2. 
 FRAM-8 (keel side) Mobile Transporter Trailing Umbilical System-Reel Assembly (MT TUS-RA) launched on ELC-2
 FRAM-9 (keel side) Nitrogen Tank Assembly (NTA SN0003) launched on ELC-2

ELC-3

ELC-3 is located on the P3 truss at the UCCAS-1 (zenith, space facing) site. ELC-3 weighs 14,023 lbs.
 FRAM-1 (top side) Cargo Transport Container-5 (CTC-5) launched on ELC-3
 FRAM-2 (top side) Special Purpose Dextrous Manipulator (SPDM) Arm launched on ELC-3
 FRAM-3 (top side) Empty, formerly held SCAN Testbed and STP-H6 (SCAN arrived in July 2012 via HTV-3. After 6 years serving as a test facility for NASA research on radio communications, SCAN was removed from the truss by SPDM/Dextre and loaded into the trunk of SpaceX CRS-17 for disposal.) (STP-H6 was installed in May 2019 on SpaceX CRS 17. Payload malfunctioned in September 2021 with XCOM deactivated by the DOD in October. Payload was removed by SPDM/Dextre November 2021 and disposed of on Cygnus NG-16. )
 FRAM-4 (top side) S band Antenna Sub-System Assembly #3 (SASA) launched on ELC-3
 FRAM-5 (keel side) TSIS (launched with SDS on SpaceX CRS 13) FRAM formerly held Space Test Program-Houston 3 (STP-H3) DOD experiment launched on ELC-3 removed by the SPDM and placed on HTV-4 for disposal.
 FRAM-6 (keel side) Ammonia Tank Assembly (ATA) launched on ELC-3
 FRAM-7 (keel side) High Pressure Gas Tank (HPGT) launched on ELC-3
 FRAM-8 (keel side) S band Antenna Sub-System Assembly #2 (SASA) launched on ELC-3

ELC-4

ELC-4 is located on the S3 truss at the PAS-4 (nadir, earth facing) site, alongside ESP-3 at PAS-3. ELC-4 weighs 8,235 lbs.
 Heat Rejection System Radiator (HRSR) launched on the top side of ELC-4
 FRAM-1 (keel side) Cargo Transport Container-2 (CTC-2) delivered to ISS by HTV-2 (EP) via SPDM held by the SPDM since its initial delivery by the HTV-2
 FRAM-2 (keel side) MUSES delivered by SpaceX Dragon CRS-11
 FRAM-3 (keel side) SAGE III, formerly held Robotic Refueling Mission (RRM) was delivered to the ISS by STS-135, placing it temporarily on the SPDM at Destiny. (The RRM held by the SPDM was later moved to this FRAM. Removed by SPDM/Dextre on March 5, 2017 and stored in the trunk of SpaceX Dragon CRS10 for disposal.)
 FRAM-4 (keel side) Utility Transfer Assembly (delivered by HTV-4 EP via SPDM Aug. 2013)
 FRAM-5 (keel side) Flex Hose Rotary Coupler (FHRC SN1005) delivered to the ISS by HTV-2 Exposed Pallet (EP), was then moved to this FRAM via SPDM

See also
External Stowage Platform
Integrated Cargo Carrier
Scientific research on the ISS
Orbital replacement unit

References

General
 NASA/Goddard Space Flight Center, ExPRESS Logistics Carrier Project Office, ExPRESS Logistics Carrier Operations Concept Document. ELC-OPS-000131

Components of the International Space Station
Science facilities on the International Space Station